Babis may refer to:

Andrej Babiš, Former Czech Prime Minister
Kasia Babis, Polish cartoonist
Vasilis Babis (born 1996), Greek footballer
Followers of the Báb, a 19th-century Persian prophet and founder of Bábism